The 1994 Davis Cup World Group Qualifying Round was held from 23 to 25 September. They were the main play-offs of the 1994 Davis Cup. The winners of the playoffs advanced to the 1995 Davis Cup World Group, and the losers were relegated to their respective Zonal Regions I.

Teams
Bold indicates team had qualified for the 1995 Davis Cup World Group.
From World Group

 
 
 
 
 
 
 
 

 From Americas Group I

 
 

 From Asia/Oceania Group I

 
 

 From Europe/Africa Group I

Results summary
Date: 23–25 September

The eight losing teams in the World Group first round ties and eight winners of the Zonal Group I final round ties competed in the World Group Qualifying Round for spots in the 1995 World Group.

Qualifying results

New Zealand vs. Australia

Uruguay vs. Austria

Israel vs. Belgium

Portugal vs. Croatia

Denmark vs. Peru

Hungary vs. Italy

Indonesia vs. Switzerland

India vs. South Africa

References

External links
Davis Cup Official Website

World Group Qualifying Round